Coull is a surname. Notable people with the surname include:

Cynthia Coull (born 1965), Canadian figure skater
Gary Coull (1954–2006), Canadian businessman
George Coull (1862–1934), Scottish pharmaceutical chemist
Joanna Coull (b. 1973), British swimmer
Robert Coull (b. 1966), British cyclist

See also
Coull Castle, in Scotland
Coull Quartet, English string quartet

English-language surnames